Montagne (Le Montàgne in local dialect) was a comune (municipality) in Trentino in the northern Italian region Trentino-Alto Adige/Südtirol, located about  west of Trento. It was merged with Preore and Ragoli on January 1, 2016, to form a new municipality, Tre Ville.

The municipality of Montagne contains the frazioni (subdivisions, mainly villages and hamlets) Cort, Larzana and Binio.

Montagne borders the following municipalities: Ragoli, Spiazzo, Bocenago, Pelugo, Stenico, Villa Rendena, Vigo Rendena, Darè and Preore.

Demographic evolution

References

Cities and towns in Trentino-Alto Adige/Südtirol